Thato Siska is a Motswana former footballer who played as a striker. He played for the Botswana national football team between 2003 and 2007.

External links

Living people
Association football midfielders
Botswana footballers
Mochudi Centre Chiefs SC players
Botswana international footballers
Notwane F.C. players
Uniao Flamengo Santos F.C. players
Year of birth missing (living people)